The 1922–23 Clarkson Golden Knights men's ice hockey season was the 3rd season of play for the program.

Season
The third season for the program began well, with Clarkson winning their first match against an amateur team from Ogdensburg. A week later they renewed their now-annual rivalry with Alexandria Bay, falling 3–6. The team then met Cornell for the first time and scratched out a 0–0 draw. It was the first intercollegiate game for Tech that didn't end in a lopsided defeat, so the program was at least improving in that regard. A rematch with Alexandria Bay at the end of the month served as the team's first home game. While the score was closer, the result was the same and Clarkson entered February with a losing record.

Of the team's final six games, four were eventually cancelled. Despite the trouble, however, the Knights won both matches to finish the year on a high note. Demonstrating just how improved the team was, they managed to earn a victory over Hamilton, who had outscored Clarkson 3–18 in the two previous meetings.

Roster

Standings

Schedule and Results

|-
!colspan=12 style=";" | Regular Season

References

Clarkson Golden Knights men's ice hockey seasons
Clarkson 
Clarkson
Clarkson
Clarkson